The Tontitown School Building is a historic former school building on US Highway 412 (US 412) in Tontitown, Arkansas.  It is a single-story hip-roofed building, fashioned out of concrete blocks.  It has corner blocks set in a quoin pattern, and gabled dormers front and rear which house paired round-arch windows.  The front entry is sheltered by a gabled portico supported by Corinthian columns.  The school was built in 1920 to accommodated the community's growing Italian immigrant population.  The building is now owned by the adjacent St. Joseph's Church.

The building was listed on the National Register of Historic Places in 1992.

See also
National Register of Historic Places listings in Washington County, Arkansas

References

School buildings on the National Register of Historic Places in Arkansas
National Register of Historic Places in Washington County, Arkansas
1920 establishments in Arkansas
School buildings completed in 1920
Schools in Washington County, Arkansas
Italian-American culture in Arkansas
Roman Catholic Diocese of Little Rock